CCHD may refer to:

Catholic Campaign for Human Development, the national anti-poverty and social justice program of the United States Conference of Catholic Bishops
Charleston Cemeteries Historic District, a cluster of 23 cemeteries north of downtown Charleston, South Carolina